Mado may refer to:

Biology
Mado (fish) (in New Zealand), Atypichthys latus, a species of perciform fish

Geography
Mado, Burkina Faso, a village in south-western Burkina Faso
Mado Gashi (also Modogashe), a small remote town in the Eastern Province of Kenya
Mado (마도 馬島), an island in Hadong County, South Gyeongsang Province, South Korea
Mado, a township in Hwaseong, Gyeonggi Province, South Korea

Organizations
Mado (restaurateur), abbreviation of "Maraş Dondurması", a Turkish café and restaurant chain, famous for its unique ice cream
Mado (manufacturer), aka Oje Parvaz Mado Nafar, an Iranian company that specializes in aircraft propulsion systems

People
Mado Lamotte, stage name of Luc Provost, a Montréal drag queen
Mado Robin, (1918–1960), a French Soprano
Michio Mado (1909–2014), a Japanese poet

Various media
Mado (film), a French-Italian film by Claude Sautet, premiered in 1976
Orpheus no Mado, a manga by Riyoko Ikeda
Mado is also the Creek and Seminole word for "thank you"